Heroes of the Mine is a 1932 British drama film directed by Widgey R. Newman and starring Moore Marriott, Wally Patch and Terence de Marney. It was made as a quota quickie at Bushey Studios.

Cast
 Moore Marriott as Gaffer  
 Wally Patch as Bob  
 Terence de Marney as Youngster  
 John Milton as Taffy  
 Eric Adeney as Timberman  
 Agnes Brantford as Mrs. Latham 
 Ian Wilson as Ponyboy

References

Bibliography
 Chibnall, Steve. Quota Quickies: The Birth of the British 'B' Film. British Film Institute, 2007.
 Low, Rachael. Filmmaking in 1930s Britain. George Allen & Unwin, 1985.
 Wood, Linda. British Films, 1927-1939. British Film Institute, 1986.

External links

1932 films
British drama films
1932 drama films
Films directed by Widgey R. Newman
Quota quickies
Bushey Studios films
British black-and-white films
1930s English-language films
1930s British films